Museum of the Great Plains or Great Plains Museum may refer to:

Museum of the Great Plains (Oklahoma), in Lawton, Oklahoma
Museum of the Great Plains (Wichita County, Kansas), in Leoti, Kansas, in the National Register-listed Municipal Auditorium and City Hall
Great Plains Black History Museum, North Omaha, Nebraska
Great Plains Art Museum, at Center for Great Plains Studies, University of Nebraska-Lincoln
Great Plains Transportation Museum, Wichita, Kansas
Great Plains Dinosaur Museum and Field Station, Malta, Montana
Great Plains Zoo and Delbridge Museum of Natural History, Sioux Falls, South Dakota

See also
Plains Art Museum, Fargo, North Dakota
Southern Plains Indian Museum, Anadarko, Oklahoma
Laramie Plains Museum, Laramie, Wyoming
Great Plains section of the Hungarian Open Air Museum, Szentendre, Hungary